Mount Porras is a 1,378 feet (420 m.) mountain peak in the  Tipulu-an Mau-it Rivers Watershed Forest Reserve, now known as Sibalom Natural Park. Sibalom Natural Park is located in the municipality of Sibalom, Antique, Panay Island, which was proclaimed a natural park on 23 April 2000.

References

Landforms of Antique (province)
Porras